is a fantasy role-playing video game developed by Hudson Soft for the PC Engine. The original PC Engine version was only released in Japan.

The game has never been officially translated into English despite becoming available as a downloadable purchase in United States and Europe.

A sequel, Necromancer 2, was released on mobile devices in Japan. It was ported to the DSi in 2010 and released as Jaseiken Necromancer: Nightmare Reborn.

Re-releases
On December 2, 2006, Jaseiken Necromancer saw its first release on the Nintendo Wii Virtual Console in Japan.

On December 16, 2009, the game was re-released for the PlayStation 3 and PlayStation Portable, available only on PlayStation Network in Japan.

In February 2011, the game was released as Necromancer on Apple's App Store, however it is no longer available to purchase.

In March 2017, the game was released in Japan on the Nintendo Wii U Virtual Console. In February 2018 it was added to the United States and Europe eShops in original untranslated form, the first time the game was available for purchase outside of Japan.

In 2020, the game was released as one of the 57 games included in the international release of the TurboGrafx-16 Mini.

References

Role-playing video games
Hudson Soft games
IOS games
Action role-playing video games
TurboGrafx-16 games
Virtual Console games
PlayStation Network games
Japan-exclusive video games
1988 video games
Video games developed in Japan
Video games scored by Jun Chikuma